Brenti Bat Pora village is located in Anantnag tehsil of Anantnag district in Jammu and Kashmir, India.

Demographics

According to Census 2011 information, the location code or village code of Brenti Bat Pora village is 003700. Brinty Batpora village is located in Anantnag tehsil of Anantnag district in Jammu and Kashmir, India.

Brinty Batpora has a total population of 5,988 people. There are about 885 houses in Brinty Batpora village.

Transport

By rail
Sadura Railway Station & Anantnag Railway Station are the very near by railway stations to Brenti Bat Pora. However ever Jammu Tawi Railway Station is major railway station 243 km near to Brenti Bat Pora.

References

Villages in Anantnag district
Ancient Indian cities
Tourist attractions in Srinagar
Kashmir
Anantnag district